Emma Igelström (born 6 March 1980 in Karlshamn) is a former breaststroke swimmer and European record holder from Sweden.  She competed in the 2000 Olympics She quit her career because of bulimia nervosa. Igelström competed as a celebrity dancer in Let's Dance 2014 and was the first to be eliminated.

Personal bests

Long course (50 m)

Short course (25 m)

Clubs
Karlshamns SK
Helsingborgs SS
Spårvägens SF
Göteborg Sim

References

1980 births
Living people
Swedish female medley swimmers
Swedish female breaststroke swimmers
Swimmers at the 2000 Summer Olympics
Olympic swimmers of Sweden
People from Karlshamn
World record setters in swimming
Medalists at the FINA World Swimming Championships (25 m)
European Aquatics Championships medalists in swimming
Sportspeople from Blekinge County
21st-century Swedish women